Günther Haack (1929–1965) was a German actor.

Selected filmography
 Alarm in the Circus (1954)
 The Czar and the Carpenter (1956)
 Don't Forget My Little Traudel (1957)
 Das hölzerne Kälbchen (1960)
 Christine (1963)

External links
 

1929 births
1965 deaths
German male film actors
Male actors from Berlin
20th-century German male actors